Tamika is a female given name. It is considered to be an African-American name in the United States.

Notable people with this name include:
 Tamika Catchings, American basketball player
 Tamika D. Mallory, American activist
 Tamika Domrow, Australian swimmer
 Tamika Lawrence, American actress
 Tamika Louis, American basketball coach
 Tamika Saxby, Australian squash player
 Tamika Scott, American singer
 Tamika Whitmore, American basketball player
 Tamika Williams, American basketball player

As a male name
 Tamika Mkandawire, Malawian footballer

References